Peter Lymburner Robertson (December 10, 1879 – September 28, 1951) was a Canadian inventor, industrialist, salesman, and philanthropist who popularized the square-socket drive for screws, often called the Robertson drive. Although a square-socket drive had been conceived decades before (having been patented in 1875 by one Allan Cummings of New York City), it had never been developed into a commercial success because the design was difficult to manufacture.  Robertson's efficient manufacturing technique using cold forming for the screw's head is what made the idea a commercial success. He produced his screws (patented in Canada in 1909) in his Milton, Ontario, factory starting in 1908. The brand has been sold over the years, and the manufacturing for the present corporation (Robertson Inc.) is done in Jiaxing, Zhejiang, China; but the Milton, Ontario, building was still a head office for a long time before moving to nearby Burlington, Ontario.

Robertson also wrote a book (short title The Remedy, 1932) which suggested a strategy to end the Great Depression. It discussed topics including national debts, currencies, and the gold standard.

Robertson was born in 1879 in Seneca Township, Ontario (see historic townships of Haldimand County). As a salesman for a Philadelphia tool company in eastern Canadian sales territories, he was demonstrating tools one day when his straight-bladed screwdriver slipped and cut his hand (a common mishap with the straight slot design). This prompted him to design a different drive for screws that would slip less, leading to his square-socket drive. Robertson headed the Robertson Screw Company until his death in 1951.

The Fisher Body company, which made the car bodies for the Ford Motor Company, was one of Robertson's first customers and used over 700 Robertson screws in its Model T car. Henry Ford, after finding that the screw saved him about 2 hours of work for each car, attempted to get an exclusive licence for the use and manufacture of the Robertson screw in the US. He was turned down by Robertson who felt it was not in his best interest and shortly after that, Ford found that Henry F. Phillips had invented another kind of socket screw and had no such reservations. Although the Robertson screw is most popular in Canada, it is used extensively in boat building because it tends not to slip and damage material, it can be used with one hand, and it is much easier to remove/replace after weathering.

References

External links
 Peter Lymburner Robertson at collectionscanada.gc.ca

Bibliography
 
 
 

1879 births
1951 deaths
Canadian inventors
Screws